Frederick Marsden  (1819 – 20 March 1870) was an Australian cricketer. He played two first-class cricket matches for Victoria.

See also
 List of Victoria first-class cricketers

References

1819 births
1870 deaths
Australian cricketers
Victoria cricketers
People from Lewisham
Cricketers from Greater London
Melbourne Cricket Club cricketers